was a railway station in Horonobe, Teshio District, Hokkaidō, Japan.

Lines
Hokkaido Railway Company
Sōya Main Line Station W71

Layout
Kami-Horonobe Station has a single side platform.

Adjacent stations

Stations of Hokkaido Railway Company
Railway stations in Hokkaido Prefecture
Railway stations in Japan opened in 1925
Railway stations closed in 2021